Talak Al-Otaibi (born 26 October 1965) is a Saudi Arabian sport shooter. He competed in the 1984 Summer Olympics.

References

1965 births
Living people
Shooters at the 1984 Summer Olympics
Saudi Arabian male sport shooters
Olympic shooters of Saudi Arabia
Sportspeople from Riyadh